Groton School (founded as Groton School for Boys) is a private college-preparatory boarding school located in Groton, Massachusetts. Ranked as one of the top five boarding high schools in the United States in Niche (2021–2022), it is affiliated with the Episcopalian tradition. 

Groton enrolls about 380 boys and girls, from the eighth through twelfth grades. It has one of the largest endowments of any prep school in the country at $477,000,000 as of June 30, 2021. Tuition, room and board, and required fees in 2014–2015 amounted to $56,700 (with books extra); 38% of the students receive financial aid. 

The school is a member of the Independent School League. There have been many famous Groton alumni in business and government, including U.S. President Franklin D. Roosevelt. For the 2020–2021 admissions cycle, Groton School reported an acceptance rate of 9%.

History

Groton School was founded in 1884 by the Rev. Endicott Peabody, a member of a prominent Massachusetts family and an Episcopal clergyman. The land for the school was donated to Peabody by two brothers, James and Prescott Lawrence, whose family home was located on Farmers Row in Groton, Massachusetts, north of Groton School's present location.  Backed by affluent figures of the time, such as his father, Samuel Endicott Peabody, the Rt. Rev. Phillips Brooks, the Rev. William Lawrence, William Crowninshield Endicott, and J.P. Morgan, Peabody received pledges of $39,000 for the construction of a schoolhouse, if an additional $40,000 could be raised as an endowment.  The endowment is $477,000,000 as of June 30, 2021, or well over $1,000,000 per student today.  Groton School received early support from the Roosevelt family, including future President Theodore Roosevelt, and filled quickly.

Peabody served as headmaster of the school for over fifty years, until his retirement in 1940.  He instituted a Spartan educational system that included cold showers and cubicles, subscribing to the model of "muscular Christianity" which he himself experienced at Cheltenham College in England as a boy. Peabody hoped to graduate men who would serve the public good, rather than enter professional life.

Peabody was succeeded at the end of the 1940 school year by the Rev. John Crocker, who had been for 10 years the chaplain for Episcopal students at Princeton University. He himself was a 1918 graduate of Groton School; 15 members of his family were alumni. Crocker's tenure included the period of the Civil Rights Movement. In September 1951, three years before the Supreme Court's Brown v. Board of Education decision outlawing segregation in public schools, Groton School accepted its first African-American student. In April 1965 Crocker and his wife, accompanied by 75 Groton School students, marched with the Rev. Martin Luther King Jr., during a civil rights demonstration in Boston. After 25 years as headmaster at Groton School, he retired in June 1965. After Crocker, the Rev. Bertrand Honea Jr., led the School from 1965 to 1969; Paul Wright from 1969 to 1974; the Rev. Rowland Cox from 1974 to 1977; William Polk from 1978 to 2003; and Richard Commons from 2003 to 2013. A South African, Temba Maqubela, became the headmaster in July 2013.

Groton School has changed significantly since 1884. Originally, it admitted only boys; the school became coeducational in 1975. Although most students in the early years were from New England and New York, its students now come from across the country and around the world. However, some traditions remain, such as the school's commitment to public service, its small community, and its attachment to the Episcopal Church.

The school has been used as a setting for several novels including Louis Auchincloss' Rector of Justin (1964). Curtis Sittenfeld's Prep (2005) has prompted speculation that the fictitious Ault School, the main setting of the novel, is in fact Groton School, as they bear striking resemblances and Sittenfeld herself attended Groton. Media coverage of the school came in the spring of 1999, when three Groton seniors alleged they and other students had been sexually abused by students in dormitories in 1996 and 1997.

The GRAIN (GRoton Affordability and INclusion) initiative, begun in 2014, froze tuition for three years and ensured that no applicant would be turned away for financial reasons. The tuition freeze, and subsequent tuition restraint, dropped Groton's tuition from #1 among 40 peer schools to #39. Currently, Groton is one of three secondary boarding schools in the country to offer free education to qualified students from families with household incomes below $75,000 a year.

Campus

Groton has a  campus, including athletic fields, academic buildings and dormitories. The School's buildings include St. John's Chapel, the Schoolhouse, Brooks House and Hundred House Dormitories, the McCormick Library, the Campbell Performing Arts Center, the Dining Hall, the Dillon Art Center and De Menil Gallery. Other facilities include the Athletic and Recreation Center, Pratt and O'Brien Rinks and Tennis Center, the Bingham Boathouse, outdoor tennis clay courts and hardcourts, and faculty homes.

Students
George Biddle, a 1902 graduate, wrote, "Ninety-five percent of the boys came from what they considered the aristocracy of America. Their fathers belonged to the Somerset, the Knickerbocker, the Philadelphia or the Baltimore Clubs. Among them was a goodly slice of the wealth of the nation".

The Form of 2013 median SAT scores were 700 reading, 710 writing, and 700 math. Between 2008 and 2012, Groton graduates attended the following colleges most frequently (in order): Georgetown University, Harvard University, Trinity College, Yale University, Tufts University, Stanford University, Brown University, Dartmouth College, Princeton University, and the University of Pennsylvania.

Abuse allegation
In Spring 1999, Middlesex County DA's Office began investigating the claim of three Groton seniors. They alleged they, and other students, had been sexually abused by students in dormitories in 1996 and 1997. During the school's investigation of the matter, another student brought a similar complaint to the school's attention. In 2005, the school pleaded guilty in criminal court to a misdemeanor charge of failing to report this younger student's sexual abuse complaint to the state and paid a $1,250 fine. The school issued an apology to the victims, and the civil suit stemming from the first student's complaint was settled out of court. In the fall of 2006, as part of the settlement, the School published a full apology to the boy who first alleged the abuse in 1999.

In popular culture 

 Gilmore Girls – Logan Huntzberger, played by Matt Czuchry, has a picture of Endicott Peabody from his time at Groton. Both characters Logan and Christopher Hayden, played by David Sutcliffe, claim to have been kicked out of Groton.

See also
Saint Grottlesex

Notable alumni

References

Further reading
 Ashburn, Frank D. (1944). Peabody of Groton. New York: Coward McCann.
 Fentons, John H. (Jun. 13, 1965). "Groton Headmaster Ends 25-Year Tenure." The New York Times, p. 80.
 Hoyt, Edwin P. (1968). The Peabody Influence: How a Great New England Family Helped to Build America. New York: Dodd, Mead & Co.
 McLachlan, James (1979). "The Resurgence of the Gentleman: Groton and the Progressive Educational Ideal" (Chapter 9). In: American Boarding Schools: A Historical Study. New York: Scribner's, pp. 242–98.
 Cookson, Peter W. (Jr), and Caroline Hodges Persell (1987). Preparing For Power: America's Elite Boarding Schools.

External links
 School official website
 Groton School Admissions Video on SchoolFair.tv
 The Association of Boarding Schools profile

 
1884 establishments in Massachusetts
Boarding schools in Massachusetts
Buildings and structures in Groton, Massachusetts
Co-educational boarding schools
Educational institutions established in 1884
Episcopal schools in the United States
Education in Groton, Massachusetts
Independent School League
Private high schools in Massachusetts
Private middle schools in Massachusetts
Private preparatory schools in Massachusetts
Schools in Middlesex County, Massachusetts